A strike notice (or notice to strike) is a document served by members of a trade union or an analogous body of workers to an employer or negotiator stating an intent to commit an upcoming strike action. The document largely contains:

 an overview of grievances and conditions
 a statement that negotiations with the employer have failed
 an intended time and duration for the strike
 advice to prepare for the impact of the strike and return to the negotiating table at the earliest

A strike notice is usually issued to an employer or negotiators after union leadership and participating workers have agreed on the set terms of a strike action. In contrast, a wildcat strike action usually involves workers going on strike without the approval of union leadership or the serving of a notice.

Strike notices are often legally required of public sector workers or unions within a specific period (i.e., 10 days before the intended strike action commencement).

References

Labor disputes
Letters (message)